Mohammad Saad (born 24 March 1990) is a Pakistani first-class cricketer who currently plays for Central Punjab. He was the leading run-scorer for Water and Power Development Authority in the 2017–18 Quaid-e-Azam Trophy, with 650 runs in eleven matches.

In April 2018, he was named in Khyber Pakhtunkhwa's squad for the 2018 Pakistan Cup. In March 2019, he was named in Khyber Pakhtunkhwa's squad for the 2019 Pakistan Cup. In September 2019, he was named in Central Punjab's squad for the 2019–20 Quaid-e-Azam Trophy tournament. In January 2021, he was named in Central Punjab's squad for the 2020–21 Pakistan Cup.

References

External links
 

1990 births
Living people
Pakistani cricketers
Water and Power Development Authority cricketers
Cricketers from Gujranwala
Central Punjab cricketers